The 2018–19 Scottish League Cup group stage was played from 14–28 July 2018. A total of 40 teams competed in the group stage. The winners of each of the eight groups, as well as the four best runners-up progressed to the second round (last 16) of the 2018–19 Scottish League Cup.

Format
The group stage consisted of eight groups of five teams. The four clubs competing in the Champions League (Celtic) and Europa League (Aberdeen, Hibernian and Rangers) qualifying rounds were given a bye through to the second round. The 40 teams competing in the group stage consisted of the other eight teams that competed in the 2017–18 Scottish Premiership, and all of the teams that competed in the 2017–18 Scottish Championship, 2017–18 Scottish League One and 2017–18 Scottish League Two, as well as the 2017–18 Highland Football League and the 2017–18 Lowland Football League champions. The teams were divided into two sections – North and South – with each section containing four top seeds, four second seeds and twelve unseeded teams. Each section was then drawn into four groups with each comprising one top seed, one second seed and three unseeded teams. The winners of each of the eight groups, as well as the four best runners-up progressed to the second round (last 16), which included the four UEFA qualifying clubs. At this stage, the competition reverted to the traditional knock-out format. The four group winners with the highest points total and the clubs entering at this stage were seeded, with the four group winners with the lowest points unseeded along with the four best runners-up.

The draw for the group stages took place on 25 May 2018 and was broadcast live on BT Sport 2. Seedings for the draw were confirmed two days in advance.

Teams

North

Seeding
Teams in Bold qualified for the second round

South

Seeding
Teams in Bold qualified for the second round

North

Group A

Matches

Group B

Matches

Group C

Matches

Group D

Matches

South

Group E

Matches

Group F

Matches

Group G

Matches

Group H

Matches

Best runners-up

Qualified teams

Top goalscorers

References

External links
 Scottish Professional Football League – League Cup official website

Scottish League Cup group stages